The Belgian Minister of the Colonies was a Belgian parliamentarian who was responsible for the territories of the colonial empire in Central Africa from 1908 to 1962, comprising the colony of the Belgian Congo (1908–60) and the international mandate of Ruanda-Urundi (1916–62). The exact title was changed on several occasions.

Ministerial title
For most of the existence of the post, office holders were known as "Minister of the Colonies" (Ministre des Colonies or Minister van Koloniën). On 30 June 1960, with the independence of the Belgian Congo, the title changed to "Minister of African Affairs" (Ministre des affaires africaines or Minister van afrikaanse zaken) whose only office holders were August de Schryver and Harold Charles d'Aspremont Lynden.

In addition to official colonial ministers, two individuals served as ministers without portfolio with a colonial brief between 1959 and 1960. Raymond Scheyven was "Minister without portfolio, charged with the economic and financial affairs of the Belgian Congo and Ruanda-Urundi" while Walter Ganshof van der Meersch was "Minister without portfolio, charged with general affairs in Africa".

List of ministers
The following is a list of ministers, cited by historian Guy Vanthemsche in his book Belgium and the Congo, 1885-1980:

Political parties
Christian Democrat
, later:

Liberal

Socialist

See also

 Federal Public Service Foreign Affairs
 Bibliothèque Africaine, overseen by the ministry starting in 1908
 Archives Africaines (Belgium), containing 5 km of colonial ministry-related records
 List of prime ministers of Belgium
 List of Belgian monarchs
 List of heads of state of the Democratic Republic of the Congo
 List of presidents of Burundi
 List of presidents of Rwanda

Notes

References

Bibliography

Colonies
Belgian colonial empire
Belgian Congo
Ruanda-Urundi
Belgium